Piškera (also called Jadra) is a small uninhabited island in the Croatian part of the Adriatic Sea. It is one of the Kornati Islands in central Dalmatia and its area is 2.66 km2. Its coastline is 10.64 km long.

A fishing settlement of the same name, established on the island in the 16th century, was gradually abandoned after the demise of the Republic of Venice in the late 18th century.

A marina with 118 berths operated by ACI Club, located off the coast of an adjacent isle of Panitula Vela, is open between April and October every year.

See also
Kornati Islands

References

Bibliography

 
 

Islands of Croatia
Islands of the Adriatic Sea
Kornati Islands
Uninhabited islands of Croatia
Landforms of Šibenik-Knin County